Arthur Henry Leech, FSIA  (23 March 1817 – 10 May 1890) was an Irish clergyman and Dean of Cashel from 1878 to 1890.

He was born in Dublin, the fifth son of civil servant William Ansdell Leech, an inspector with H.M. Customs in Ireland, and Mary Atkinson. He was educated at Trinity College, Dublin, receiving his BA in 1840 and MA and in 1869. He was a fellow of the  Royal Society of Antiquaries of Ireland. He was a clergyman in the diocese for more than 50 years when he died at the deanery, aged 73.

He married Ellen Wilson, daughter of Thomas Maunsell Wilson and the Hon. Isabella Monck and granddaughter of Charles Monck, 1st Viscount Monck. They had one who died in infancy and five daughters.

Arms

References

Irish Anglicans
Alumni of Trinity College Dublin
Deans of Cashel
1817 births
1890 deaths
Christian clergy from Dublin (city)